The International Financial Services District (IFSD) (Scottish Gaelic: Sgìre Seirbheisean Ionmhais Eadar-nàiseanta) is a public-private financial district  in Glasgow, Scotland. Based at Scottish Enterprise, the £1 billion venture aims to create an attractive inward investment location for leading international financial services companies and a re-location option for existing Glasgow-based companies, seeking to expand their operations. 

The district offers over 3 million sq ft of top quality Grade A office space which has been developed at the district since the development of the project in 2001. Major tenants of the International Financial Services District include Morgan Stanley, JPMorgan Chase and Barclays.

History
Prior to the launch of the IFSD in 2001, the long-term decline of the old Port of Glasgow and its associated wharves and warehousing had resulted in a neglected infrastructure in Glasgow's city centre area fronting the River Clyde, otherwise known as the Broomielaw.  The result was a small number of isolated modern offices, standing adjacent to derelict land and vacant dilapidated buildings, loosely connected to Glasgow's traditional core business district centred on Blythswood Square at the western end of the city centre.

Planning led by Scottish Enterprise and Glasgow City Council, aimed to create a new, dynamic focus for the area’s regeneration, through the establishment of the IFSD.  This was an important development of Glasgow’s financial services sector, which, with 28,000 employees, was recognised as vital to the city’s economic fortunes. In order to develop a fully serviced financial services district and exploit its long term potential, significant investment was required to create the right environment.

Definition

No official boundary of the IFSD exists; notionally the term refers to the approximately 1 square kilometre area of the city centre bounded by the M8 motorway to the west, the River Clyde the south, Hope Street to the east, and Sauchiehall Street to the north - taking in most of Blythswood Hill, the south eastern fringe of Anderston and part of Charing Cross.  This has given rise to the area's nicknames in the popular press: the Square Kilometre (in reference to the "square mile" of the City of London), and more the popular and widely used Wall Street On Clyde.

Economic Impact
A constant stream of new buildings has appeared in the IFSD since 2001, with more in the pipeline. The Aurora building in the IFSD for example has won several UK wide awards as large scale speculative office building.

Buildings & Notable Residents

Buildings Under Construction

Transport

Railway
The IFSD is connected by five railway stations, with routes that reach regionally and nationally.

 Anderston station
 Charing Cross station
 Glasgow Central station
 Glasgow Queen Street station
 Exhibition Centre station

Subway Rail
The IFSD is well connected with two Glasgow Subway stations. The Glasgow Subway the world's third oldest underground metro railway in the world. The two stations that cover the IFSD are:

 Buchanan Street Subway
 St Enoch Subway

Road
The IFSD has links to the nearby M8 Motorway, which runs through Central Glasgow. The motorway connects the city with Edinburgh, Livingston, Glasgow Airport, Paisley, Erskine Bridge and Greenock.

Pedestrian
The Tradeston Bridge, completed in 2009, allows quick access by foot or bicycle over the Clyde between the IFSD and the Tradeston district, a feature which was previously lacking from the area requiring pedestrians to make an  detour via the George V Bridge to reach the same point.

References
 Glasgow IFSD (2010) Glasgow International Financial Services District, Leaflet.
 Glasgow IFSD (2010) Glasgow International Financial Service District, Website, Available from: https://archive.today/20130505014554/http://www.ifsdglasgow.co.uk/Completed_Property.aspx.

External links
 IFSD Website
 Completed Buildings in Glasgow

Economy of Glasgow
Redevelopment projects in the United Kingdom
Financial districts in the United Kingdom
Central business districts in the United Kingdom
Financial services in Scotland
2001 establishments in Scotland
Public–private partnership
Organisations supported by the Scottish Government